All the Wilderness (originally titled The Wilderness of James) is a 2014 American drama film written and directed by Michael Johnson. The film stars Kodi Smit-McPhee, Isabelle Fuhrman, Danny DeVito, Virginia Madsen and Evan Ross. The film was released on February 20, 2015, by Screen Media Films.

Premise
James recently lost his father and is having trouble coping. He also seems obsessed with the death of people and animals. Because of this and other psychological problems, his mother sends him to Dr. Pembry; James does not want to go. He ends up making friends with street musician Harmon and spending his nights on the city streets.

Cast
Kodi Smit-McPhee as James Charm
Isabelle Fuhrman as Val
Danny DeVito as Dr. Pembry 	
Virginia Madsen as	Abigail Charm
Evan Ross as Harmon
Hannah Barefoot as Crystal
Pat Janowski as Carolyn 
Tabor Helton as William Charm

Production
Filming took place in Portland, Oregon.

Release
The film premiered at South by Southwest on March 9, 2014. On November 4, 2014, Screen Media Films acquired distribution rights to the film. The film was released in the United States on February 20, 2015.

Reception
All the Wilderness received generally positive reviews from critics. The review aggregator website Rotten Tomatoes reported a 60% approval rating, with a rating average of 5.88/10 based on 25 reviews. On Metacritic, which assigns a normalized rating out of 100, the film has a score of 54 based on 11 reviews, indicating "mixed or average reviews".

References

External links
 

2014 films
American drama films
2014 drama films
Films produced by Andrea Sperling
Films produced by Jonathan Schwartz
Films shot in Portland, Oregon
2010s English-language films
2010s American films